Nimz v Freie und Hansestadt Hamburg (1991) C-184/89 is an EU labour law case, which held that a justification that part-time employees could be paid less, since full-time employees could acquire skills quicker, was doubtful.

Facts
Helga Nimz worked part-time (under three quarters of full-time). She was paid less. The town council argued that full-time employees acquire ability and skill faster and should therefore be paid more.

Judgment
ECJ held that it was unlikely that the justifications offered by the Hamburg council could be valid.

External links
C-184/89

1991 in case law
Anti-discrimination law
1991 in the European Economic Community
European Union labour case law